Matters Of The Heart, is an album by American contemporary gospel music group Commissioned, released in 1994 on Benson Records. It was the last album with Fred Hammond and Michael Williams, both of whom left after this album.

Domestically, the album peaked at number 7 on the US Billboard Top Gospel albums chart, number 13 on the Billboard Top Contemporary Christian chart and number 65 on the Billboard Hot R&B/Hip-Hop Songs chart.

Track listing
 "Work on Me" – 5:00
 "Stand" – 4:56
 "Love Is the Way" – 6:27
 "Dare to Believe" – 6:20
 "Another Day in Paradise" – 6:58
 "You Can Always Come Home" – 5:42
 "When Love Calls You Home" – 4:32
 "Lay Your Troubles Down" – 6:18
 "Find Myself in You" – 4:06
 "I'm Learning" – 4:55
 "We Shall Behold Him" – 6:34
 "Draw Me Nearer" – 3:56

Personnel
Fred Hammond: vocals, bass, drum programming, key bass, keyboards, programming
Karl Reid: vocals
Marvin Sapp: vocals
Mitchell Jones: vocals
Maxx Frank: keyboards, programming, Hammond B-3 organ
Michael Williams: drums

Additional Musicians
Noel Hall: keyboards
Tim Bowman: guitar
Bo Cooper: piano
Bryan Lenox: strings, bells, oboe programming, synth bass, drums, percussion, keyboards
Dann Huff: guitar
Chuckii Booker: all instruments
Danny Duncan: programming
Marty Paoletta: saxophone
Parkes Stewart: additional background vocals
Eric Dawkins of Dawkins & Dawkins: additional background vocals
Run-DMC: rap on 'You Can Always Come Home'

References

Commissioned (gospel group) albums
1994 albums